Silabkhvor-e Bala (also Romanized as Sīlābkhvor-e Bālā; also known as Seilabkhor Olya, Seylābkhvor-e ‘Olyā, Sīlābkhor, and Sīlākhor-e ‘Olyā) is a village in Hotkan Rural District, in the Central District of Zarand County, Kerman Province, Iran. At the 2006 census, its population was 93, in 22 families.

References 

Populated places in Zarand County